Midnapore Collegiate Girls' High School, is a girl's higher secondary school located in Midnapore town, West Bengal, India.

The school follows the course curricula of West Bengal Board of Secondary Education (WBBSE) and West Bengal Council of Higher Secondary Education (WBCHSE) for Standard 10th and 12th Board examinations respectively.

See also
Education in India
List of schools in India
Education in West Bengal

References

External links

High schools and secondary schools in West Bengal
Schools in Paschim Medinipur district
Girls' schools in West Bengal
Educational institutions in India with year of establishment missing